The 2021–22 season (officially known as Liga de Plata and also as Torneo Luis Baltazar Ramírez) will be El Salvador's Segunda División de Fútbol Salvadoreño. The season will be split into two championships Apertura 2021 and Clausura 2022. The champions of the Apertura and Clausura play the direct promotion playoff every year. The winner of that series ascends to Primera División de Fútbol de El Salvador.

Changes to the 2021–22 seasons

Teams promoted to 2021–22 Primera División de El Salvador
 Platense 

Teams relegated to Segunda División de Fútbol Salvadoreño  - Apertura 2021
 Atlético Sonsonate (Originally C.D. Sonsonate were relegated , however the club disbanded due to non payments).

Teams relegated to Tercera Division de Fútbol Salvadoreño - Apertura 2021 
 None

Teams promoted from Tercera Division De Fútbol Profesional - Apertura 2021
 Inter San Salvador
 Corinto FC 

New Teams or teams that purchased a spot in the Segunda division
 Ilopango FC (Purchased spot of C.D. Liberal)
 Atletico Sonsonate  (Purchased spot of Ilopaneco)
 Once Lobos (Returned after a hiatus)
 Racing Jnr (Returned after a hiatus)
 Topiltzin  (Returned after a hiatus)
 Gerardo Barrios  (Returned after a hiatus)
 El Vencedor (Returned after a hiatus)

Teams that failed to register for the Apertura 2021
 C.D. Liberal (Sold spot to Ilopango FC)
 Ilopaneco (Sold spot to Atletico Sonsonate)

Notable events

Change of name and ownership
On July 11, 2021 after gaining promotion to the segunda división the team Inter Salvador Silvar changed ownership and the club was relocated to Santa Tecla, the club rebranded itself as Inter Tecla.

New team
After the Apertura 2021 season, Real Atletico Sonsonate sold their spot to Fenix F.C. who were previously playing in ADFAS Sonsonate, equivalent to the fourth division.

Managerial changes

Apertura

Teams

Only 20 teams chose to participate in this season Competition

Regular Seasons

Group Centro Occidente

Centro-Oriente

Top scorers

Grupo A

Grupo B

Finals

Quarter finals

First Leg

Second Leg 

Inter Sivar tied 3-3 on Aggregate, won  4-3 penalties.

Municipal FC won 3-1 on Aggregate

Cacahuatique won 3-0 on Aggregate.

Marte Soyapango  won 3-1 on Aggregate.

Semi finals

First Leg

Second Leg 

Municipal FC won 5-3 on Aggregate.

Cacahuatique won 1-0 on Aggregate

Grand final

Individual awards

Clausura

Teams

Only 20 teams chose to Participate in this season Competition

Regular Seasons

Group A

Group B

Top scorers

Grupo A

Grupo B

Finals

Quarter finals

First Leg

Second Leg 

 Racing Jr  won 3-2 on Aggregate'Inter San Salvador won 4-2 on AggregateCacahuatique won 3-2 on Aggregate.C.D. Dragon won 2-1 on Aggregate.Semi finals

 First Leg 

 Second Leg Inter SS won 3-1 on Aggregate.Dragon won 6-4 on Aggregate''

Grand final

Individual awards

Aggregate table 
The Aggregate table is the general ranking for the 2021–22 season. This table is a sum of the Apertura 2021 and Clausura 2022 tournament standings. The aggregate table is used to determine the relegation to the Tercera divisions.

References

External links
 

Segunda División de Fútbol Salvadoreño seasons
2021–22 in Salvadoran football
EL Sal